Jeremy Brotton is a British historian. He is Professor of Renaissance Studies at Queen Mary University of London, a television and radio presenter and a curator.

Brotton writes about literature, history, material culture, trade, and east-west relations, particularly in the sixteenth and seventeenth centuries. He employs interdisciplinary approaches, looking at art, politics, history, travel writing and literature. His book A History of the World in Twelve Maps (Allen Lane, 2012) has been translated into twelve languages. It was accompanied by a three-part series on BBC Four, Maps: Power, Plunder and Possession. His The Sale of the Late King's Goods: Charles I and His Art Collection (Macmillan, 2006) was nominated for the Samuel Johnson Prize (now the Baillie Gifford Prize). It wryly proposes that the dispersal of Charles I's art collection in 1649 was a democratic move, one that merits imitation in the contemporary world. His 2016 book This Orient Isle: Elizabethan England and the Islamic World (London: Allen Lane, 2016) was serialised on BBC Radio 4 and won the Historical Writers Association Non-Fiction Crown (2017).

Brotton collaborated as a curator and commentator with the artist and director of Factum Arte, Adam Lowe, in the exhibit Penelope’s Labour: Weaving Words and Images, at the Venice Biennale in 2011, and in 2019 he and map librarian Nick Millea co-curated the exhibition Talking Maps at the Bodleian Library in Oxford.

Brotton has written and presented various radio programmes for BBC Radio 3, BBC Radio 4 and the BBC World Service on historical subjects including Shakespeare, the history of the ghetto, and El Dorado. He appears regularly on TV programmes and reviews for a variety of newspapers, magazines and journals.

Notable works
The Renaissance Bazaar: From the Silk Road to Michelangelo (Oxford: Oxford University Press, 2002. )
The Renaissance: A Very Short Introduction (Oxford: Oxford University Press, 2006. )
The Sale of the Late King's Goods: Charles I and his Art Collection (London: Pan Macmillan, 2006. )
A History of the World in Twelve Maps (London: Allen Lane, 2012. )
Great Maps: The World's Masterpieces Explored and Explained (London: Dorling Kindersley, 2014.  
This Orient Isle: Elizabethan England and the Islamic World (London: Allen Lane, 2016. )
The Sultan and the Queen: The Untold Story of Elizabeth and Islam (London: Viking, 2018. )
Trading Territories: Mapping the Early Modern World (London: Reaktion Books, 2018. )
(co-author with Nick Millea) Talking Maps (Oxford: The Bodleian Library, 2019.

References

External links
http://www.sed.qmul.ac.uk/staff/brottonj.html
https://literature.britishcouncil.org/writer/jerry-brotton
https://www.penguin.co.uk/authors/jerry-brotton/33061/
http://www.factum-arte.com/pag/283/Penelope-apos-s-Labour---Weaving-Words-and-Images

Academics of Queen Mary University of London
21st-century British historians
Historians of the Renaissance
BBC radio presenters
BBC television presenters
Living people
Year of birth missing (living people)